is a Japanese footballer who plays for Kataller Toyama.

Club statistics
Updated to 23 February 2018.

References

External links
Profile at Kataller Toyama
Profile at Tokushima Vortis

1991 births
Living people
Kyoto Sangyo University alumni
Association football people from Tokushima Prefecture
Japanese footballers
J1 League players
J2 League players
J3 League players
Tokushima Vortis players
Kataller Toyama players
Association football forwards